The Assassination of Julius Caesar is the eleventh studio album by Norwegian electronic band Ulver, released on 7 April 2017 via London-based label House of Mythology. The album was recorded and produced by Ulver in Oslo throughout summer 2016 and winter 2017 with mixing by Martin Glover and Michael Rendall in London, January 2017.

The cover artwork is a cropped photograph of The Rape of Proserpina (Italian: Ratto di Proserpina), a large Baroque marble sculptural group by Italian artist Gian Lorenzo Bernini, executed between 1621 and 1622. It depicts the abduction of Proserpina, who is seized and taken to the underworld by the god Pluto.

Track listing

Personnel
Ulver
Kristoffer Rygg – vocals, additional programming
Tore Ylvisaker – keyboards, programming
Ole Alexander Halstensgård – electronics
Jørn H. Sværen – miscellaneous

Additional musicians
Håvard Jørgensen – guitar (track 7)
Anders Møller – percussion
Rikke Normann – vocals (track 2)
Daniel O'Sullivan – guitar (tracks 4 and 6)
Dag Stiberg – saxophone (track 8)
Sisi Sumbundu – vocals (tracks 2 and 7)
Ivar Thormodsæter – drums
Nik Turner – saxophone (track 2)
Stian Westerhus – guitar (tracks 1 and 2)

References

2017 albums
Ulver albums